HC Spartak St. Petersburg was an ice hockey team in St. Petersburg, Russia.

History
The club was founded in 1947 as HC Spartak Leningrad and began playing the second-level Soviet league, the II gruppa. They participated in the Soviet Championship League during the 1962-63 season, but were relegated back to the second-level league after only one season in the top league. The club played in the second-level league until it was disbanded in 1965.

The club was revived as HC Spartak St. Petersburg in 1996. Initially operating only as a junior team, a senior team was founded in 1997 and began participating in the third-level Russian league, the Pervaya Liga. They played in the second-level league organized by the Russian Ice Hockey Federation during the 1998-99 season. They then participated in the Vysshaya Liga from the 1999-2000 season until they folded after the 2006-07 season.

External links
 Official website (archived)
 Club history

Defunct ice hockey teams in Russia
Sports clubs in Saint Petersburg
Ice hockey clubs established in 1947
1947 establishments in Russia
2006 disestablishments in Russia